Ashton Hayes is a village and former civil parish, now in the parish of Ashton Hayes and Horton-cum-Peel, in the unitary authority of Cheshire West and Chester and ceremonial county of Cheshire, England. It is located about 8 miles east of Chester on the B5393 road. The nearest villages are Mouldsworth to the north east and Kelsall to the south east. According to the 2011 Census it had a population of 936. The main village in the parish – formerly known as Ashton – was renamed Ashton Hayes following a referendum, to avoid confusion with other places of the same name. The civil parish was abolished in 2015 to form Ashton Hayes and Horton-cum-Peel, part of it also went to Mouldsworth.

History
In 1086, the village was recorded in the Domesday Book as comprising 12 households and lying within the hundred of Rushton in the county of Cheshire.

Medieval pottery kiln
In 1933 a pottery kiln, which had been in use between the 13th and 15th century, was discovered in the garden of Smithy House.  When excavated, it was found to consist of an oval structure with a stoke-hole on the southeast side.  It contained thousands of fragments of broken pottery.  Some of these have been reconstructed, forming about 30 objects, mainly jugs and pitchers, which are now in the Grosvenor Museum, Chester.  The site of the kiln is a scheduled monument.

Carbon neutrality
In November 2005, the Ashton Hayes Parish Council agreed that the village should try to become England's first carbon neutral village and launched a programme starting 26 January 2006. The move is supported by the local community, businesses, the local council and The Energy Saving Trust. In July 2006 the total annual output of carbon dioxide from the village was calculated by students from the University of Chester at 4,765.76 tonnes.

With the aid of a DEFRA grant, a film was made explaining the issues and the villagers' efforts, and intended to receive its premier in the village on 25 January 2007. 
It is hoped that the film will increase awareness and encourage other communities to adopt the concept.

Measures taken to offset or reduce this have included installing house insulation, installing energy saving light bulbs and wind turbines, and a large number of trees have been planted. In the first year of the programme the village reduced its carbon footprint by 20%. In the 10 years since, the figure rose to 40%. The programme has inspired other towns and cities to adopt similar models.

See also

Listed buildings in Ashton Hayes
Carbon footprint
Bioenergy Village
Sustainable energy
Energy use and conservation in the United Kingdom
Baywind Energy Co-operative
2000 Watt society

References

External links

Ashton Hayes Parish Council
Ashton Hayes near Chester, England
Ashton Hayes County Primary School
Ashton Hayes Going Carbon Neutral Project
Going Carbon Neutral (PowerPoint presentation)

Villages in Cheshire
Former civil parishes in Cheshire
Energy conservation in the United Kingdom
Cheshire West and Chester